The Raber House is an Italianate style house located at 5760 South Lafayette Avenue in the Washington Park neighborhood of Chicago, Illinois, United States.  The house was built in 1870 by Thomas Wing. It was designated a Chicago Landmark on April 16, 1996.

References

Houses completed in 1870
Houses in Chicago
Chicago Landmarks